After the Kingdom of Yugoslavia was invaded by the Axis powers during World War II, all of Bosnia was ceded to the newly created Independent State of Croatia. Axis rule in Bosnia led to widespread persecution and mass-killings of native undesirables and anti-fascists. Many Serbs themselves took up arms and joined the Chetniks, a Serb nationalist and royalist resistance movement that conducted ineffective guerrilla warfare against the occupying Nazi forces. On 12 October 1941 a group of 108 notable Muslim citizens of Sarajevo signed the Resolution of Sarajevo Muslims by which they condemned the persecution of Serbs organized by Ustaše, made distinction between Muslims who participated in such persecutions and whole Muslim population, presented information about the persecutions of Muslims by Serbs and requested security for all citizens of the country, regardless of their identity.

Starting in 1941, Yugoslav communists under the leadership of Josip Broz Tito organized their own multi-ethnic resistance group, the partisans, who fought against both Axis and Chetnik forces. On 29 November 1943 the Anti-Fascist Council of National Liberation of Yugoslavia with Tito at its helm held a founding conference in Jajce where Bosnia and Herzegovina was reestablished as a republic within the Yugoslavian federation in its Ottoman borders. Military success eventually prompted the Allies to support the Partisans, and the end of the war resulted in the establishment of the Socialist Federal Republic of Yugoslavia, with the constitution of 1946 officially making Bosnia and Herzegovina one of six constituent republics in the new state.

During the war, and following the massive deterioration of internal security under the incompetent Ustaše regime, the Nazis created a quisling Waffen-SS unit in Bosnia called the 13th Waffen Mountain Division of the SS Handschar (1st Croatian) in February 1943. Imam Halim Malkoć was the only Muslim to earn the German Iron Cross during World War II.

See also
 Drvar uprising

References

Literature
 Munoz, Antonio J., editor., The East Came West: Muslim, Hindu and Buddhist Volunteers in the German Armed Forces. (chapters 2 and 13) Bayside, NY: Axis Europa, 2001 
 Hermann Neubacher: Sonderauftrag Suedost 1940-1945, Bericht eines fliegendes Diplomaten, 2. durchgesehene Auflage, Goettingen 1956
 Ladislaus Hory and Martin Broszat: Der Kroatische Ustascha-Staat, 1941-1945 Stuttgart, 1964
 Redzic, Enver, Muslimansko Autonomastvo I 13. SS Divizija. (Sarajevo: Svjetlost, 1987).
 

 
Bosniak history
Independent State of Croatia
Jewish Bosnian history
Yugoslavia in World War II